Gus Warr (born 24 September 1999) is an English professional rugby union player who plays as a scrum-half for Sale Sharks in Premiership Rugby.

Career
He started playing rugby at Winnington Park RFC aged six before moving to Bowdon RUFC at thirteen. He played school rugby at Tarporley High School before moving to Ellesmere College at fourteen. He joined the Sale Academy aged 14. He moved to Dollar Academy for sixth form. In September 2018 he made his Premiership debut for Sale against Harlequins at the Stoop at 18.

He represented Scotland at age grade level (18,19 and 20s) and then competed for England Under-20 against Scotland in the final round of the  2019 Six Nations Under 20s Championship.

References

External links
Sale Sharks Profile
ESPN Profile
Ultimate Rugby Profile

1999 births
Living people
English rugby union players
Rugby union players from Manchester
Sale Sharks players
Rugby union scrum-halves
People educated at Dollar Academy
People educated at Ellesmere College
English people of Scottish descent